Palaemonella komaii is a species of shrimp in the family Palaemonidae, found in the Indo-Pacific. It was first described by Xinzheng Li and  Alexander Bruce in 2006, from specimens collected off Tonga and Fiji. The species epithet honours Tomoyuki Komai.

References

Palaemonidae
Crustaceans described in 2006